The 2011 Eurocup Basketball Finals was the concluding Final Four tournament of the 2010–11 Eurocup Basketball season. The event was held at Treviso in Italy from April 16 and 17, 2011.

Bracket

Semifinals

Third place game

Final

References

External links
Final Four Website

2010–11 Eurocup Basketball
2011
2011 in Italian sport
International basketball competitions hosted by Italy